5110 may refer to:

 5110 BCE, a year in the 6th millennium BC
 5110, a number in the 5000 (number) range
 5110 Belgirate, an asteroid in the Asteroid Belt, the 5110th asteroid registered
 IBM 5110, a luggable computer
 Nokia 5110, a cellphone
 Nord 5110, a French air-to-surface missile

See also